Legislative elections for the Territorial Council were held in Saint Pierre and Miquelon in March 2006.

Results 

2006 in Saint Pierre and Miquelon
Saint Pierre
Elections in Saint Pierre and Miquelon